The International Literacy Association (ILA), formerly the International Reading Association (IRA), is an international global advocacy and member professional organization that was created in 1956 to improve reading instruction, facilitate dialogue about research on reading, and encourage the habit of reading across the globe.

The organization is headquartered in Newark, Delaware, United States, with a network of more than 7.000.000 literacy educators, researchers, and experts across 128 countries, and more than 1,250 councils and affiliates worldwide. Membership fees range from US$39 to US$44, plus costs for optional journal subscriptions. Discounted subscription rates are available for residents of developing economies. The current ILA President of the Board is Dr. Kenneth Kunz.

Publishing

ILA officially ended its book publishing program on June 30, 2018. However, the Association continues to publish journals, its membership magazine, literacy briefs, and other literacy-focused texts.

ILA publishes three academic journals:

 The Reading Teacher—for those working with children to age 12
 Journal of Adolescent & Adult Literacy—for teachers of older learners
 Reading Research Quarterly—publishes contributions in literacy research

Reading Online, an e-journal, sponsored by the organization, was retired in 2005.

Literacy Today (formerly titled Reading Today), ILA’s membership magazine, was published from 1983 to 2011 as a bimonthly membership newspaper. From the 2011 August/September issue forward, the publication was split into two parts: a bimonthly print magazine and an interactive digital e-zine. Literacy Today is currently an online-only quarterly magazine.

ILA publishes position statements and literacy briefs  that advance thought leadership for the literacy profession and shaping sound public policy on education.

Standards for the Preparation of Literacy Professionals 2017 
ILA champions rigorous research as the foundation for literacy leadership and as such developed research-based standards for preparing and certifying literacy professionals: Standards for the Preparation of Literacy Professionals 2017 (Standards 2017).

Annual Conference 
ILA hosts an annual professional development conference for educators, from classroom teachers and librarians to specialized literacy professionals, administrators, and principals.  

Due to issues holding conferences during COVID period the ILA expanded its slate of virtual learning options and continues to evolve its model of professional development delivered on digital platforms.

Special Interest Groups 
ILA has over 20 special interest groups for members:

 Adolescent Literacy Interest Group of ILA
 Canadian SIG on Literacy
 Children's Literature and Reading
 Concern for Affect in Reading Education (CARE)
 Content Area Reading
 Disabled Reader Special Interest Group (DRSIG)
 District Literacy Leadership (DiLL)
 Foundation Skills
 ILARI Partnerships
Indigenous Peoples
 Language Experience Approach (LESIG)
 Leadership Educ. & Dev. for Educators in Reading (LEADER)
 Literacy and Social Responsibility
 Literacy Development in Young Children (LDYC)
 Mastery Learning
 Organization of Teacher Educators in Literacy (OTEL)
 Professors of Literacy and Teacher Education (PLTE)
 Readability
 Reading for Gifted and Creative Students
 Technology in Literacy Education (TILE)

Honor Society
ILA sponsors the honor society Alpha Upsilon Alpha.

Awards and Grants
ILA offers a number of awards and grants for educators, researchers, and authors.

Affiliations
The ILA has been recognized by the United Nations Educational, Scientific and Cultural Organization (UNESCO) since 1978; the ILA was reclassified to have Consultative Status with UNESCO in 1996 and continues to hold this status.

References

International professional associations
Organizations based in Delaware
Organizations established in 1956
Organizations promoting literacy
Bibliotherapy